Statistics of Armenian Premier League in the 1997 season.

Dvin Artashat and FC Lori are promoted.
Homenmen Yerevan changed their name into Erebuni-Homenmen Yerevan.

League table

Results

Promotion/relegation play-off

Top goalscorers

See also
 1997 in Armenian football
 1997 Armenian First League
 1997 Armenian Cup

Armenian Premier League seasons
1
Armenia
Armenia